William Ruxton may refer to:

 William Ruxton (1697–1751), Irish landowner and Member of Parliament
 William Parkinson Ruxton (1766–1847), Irish Member of Parliament